Satiari (also Romanized as Sātīārī and Sātī Yārī) is a village in Shiveh Sar Rural District, Bayangan District, Paveh County, Kermanshah Province, Iran. At the 2006 census, its population was 683, in 167 families.

References 

Populated places in Paveh County